Do Sar or Dusar or Dow Sar or Dowsar may refer to:

Do Sar, Bijar, Kurdistan Province
Do Sar, Qorveh, Kurdistan Province
Do Sar, Lorestan